Verbal Remixes & Collaborations is an EP released by Amon Tobin in 2003. It features tracks from two previously released 12" EPs: Verbal (Remixes) and Collaborations.

Track listing
"Untitled" - Kid Koala & Amon Tobin  – 5:40
"I'll Have The Waldorf Salad" - Bonobo & Amon Tobin  – 6:28
"Hot Korean Moms" - P Love & Amon Tobin  – 5:07
"Ten Piece Metric Wrench Set" - Steinski & Amon Tobin  – 5:41
"Ownage" - Doubleclick & Amon Tobin  – 6:32
"Verbal" (Prefuse 73 Dipped Escalade mix)  – 3:14
"Verbal" (Topo Gigio remix)  – 3:59
"Verbal" (Kid 606 Dancehall Devastation mix)  – 4:39
"Verbal" (Boom Bip remix)  – 5:12

Amon Tobin albums
2003 remix albums
2003 EPs
Remix EPs
Ninja Tune remix albums
Ninja Tune EPs